The following is a list of notable people from Luzerne County, Pennsylvania:

 Edie Adams, Singer, actress, & comedian; wife of Ernie Kovacs
 Nick Adams, actor, (Mister Roberts, Rebel Without a Cause), best known to audiences as Johnny Yuma of the TV series The Rebel
 Lou Barletta, congressman representing the 11th District of Pennsylvania
 Hazel Barnes, philosopher
 Douglas Carter Beane, playwright
 Al Bedner, NFL player
 Steve Bilko, 20 years old when he broke into professional baseball on September 22, 1949, with the St. Louis Cardinals
 David Bohm, quantum physicist
 Charles Calvin Bowman, mayor of Pittston and U.S. Representative from Pennsylvania
 William Bowman (fencer), Member of the 1912 U.S. Olympic Team
 Hubie Brown, basketball coach and television analyst
 James Joseph Brown, mining innovator
 Russell Bufalino, (1903–1994), organized crime leader in Pennsylvania, New York, and the American Cosa Nostra. He was portrayed by actor Joe Pesci in Martin Scorsese's 2019 film The Irishman.
 Benjamin Burnley, lead singer and guitarist for rock band Breaking Benjamin
 Lou Butera, professional pool player
 Russ Canzler, Major League Baseball player in the New York Yankees minor league organization.
 Lillian Cahn, co-founder of Coach, Inc. and Coach handbag designer
 George Catlin, artist
 Jimmy Cefalo, Penn State football player, Miami Dolphins wide receiver, radio voice of the Miami Dolphins
 Britton Chance, bio-physicist and Olympic sailor
 Mark Ciavarella, disgraced judge in kids for cash scandal
 Abe Cohen, Professional football player
 Mark Cohen, street photographer
 Flick Colby, choreographer
 Adam Comorosky, MLB outfielder
 Colleen Corby, 1960s fashion model
 Amasa Dana, former U.S. Congressman
 Stanley Woodward Davenport, U.S. Congressman (Democrat), 1899-1901
 William D'Elia, mobster
 Harry Dorish, MLB Pitcher
 Mary Lucy Dosh (1839–1861), member of the Sisters of Nazareth and volunteer nurse in the American Civil War
 Charles B. Dougherty, Army National Guard major general who commanded the 28th Infantry Division
 Mark Duda, NFL player, Lackawanna College football head coach
 Francis A. "Mother" Dunn, football player for the Canton Bulldogs
 Stanley Dudrick, Surgeon who developed TPN
 Carl Duser, baseball player
 Todd A. Eachus, former state representative of the 116th District and House majority leader of Pennsylvania
 David Evans, Hollywood filmmaker most known for the movie The Sandlot
 Jesse Fell, early experimenter with anthracite coal
 John S. Fine, 35th Governor of Pennsylvania from 1951 to 1955.
 Pat Finn, game show host whose shows include Lifetime's, The Family Channel's, and PAX's Shop 'til You Drop
 Ham Fisher, cartoonist best known for the Joe Palooka comic strip
 Steamer Flanagan, professional baseball player
 J. Harold Flannery, U.S. Representative from Pennsylvania
 Harry Livingston French, Architect
 Tess Gardella, actress
 Pete Gray, one of the two men ever to play major league baseball having lost his right arm in a childhood accident. His life is depicted in the 1986 television production A Winner Never Quits. There is a historical marker in the Hanover section of Nanticoke at Front and Center St. denoting the place of his birth.
 James L. Hallock, Wisconsin state legislator
 Harry Hamilton, Former NFL Player
 William Harmatz, jockey, winner of 1959 Preakness Stakes
 Bucky Harris, Former Major League Baseball Player
 Dan Harris (screenwriter), Hollywood director and screenwriter
 George Washington Helme, businessman and founder of Helmetta, New Jersey
 Joe Hergert, former professional football player
 Jim Hettes, UFC Fighter
 Raye Hollitt, bodybuilder, American Gladiators and actress, Skin Deep
 Joe Holup, Former NBA basketball player
 Henry M. Hoyt, early governor of Pennsylvania
 Mike Hudock, professional football player
 Qadry Ismail, former NFL wide receiver on the Baltimore Ravens
 Raghib Ismail, former NFL player and Heisman Trophy runner-up
 Stephanie Jallen, Paralympic skier
 Arthur Horace James, Superior Court Judge and Governor and Lieutenant Governor of Pennsylvania
 Florence Foster Jenkins, unconventional operatic soprano, subject of film starring Meryl Streep
 Hughie Jennings, Major League Baseball player and manager
 Ben Johnson (American sprinter), Track athlete and one of the first African-American colonels in the U.S. Army
 Russell Johnson, Actor best known as The Professor (Gilligan's Island)
 Candy Jones, fashion model, writer, radio personality
 Dorothy Andrews Elston Kabis, Treasurer of the United States
 Paul E. Kanjorski, former U.S. Representative for Pennsylvania's 11th congressional district (which includes Nanticoke)
 James Karen, actor
 Joe Katchik, Professional football player
 Michael J. Kirwan, represented Youngstown, Ohio in Congress, 1938–1970
 Franz Kline, abstract expressionist painter
 Thomas R. Kline, lawyer
 Shawn Klush, Elvis tribute artist
 Sarah Knauss, lived to age 119
 Kelsey Kolojejchick, Field hockey player for the US Olympic Team
 Mike Konnick, former MLB player
 Mary Jo Kopechne, passenger killed in car driven by Ted Kennedy at Chappaquiddick
 Harley Jane Kozak, actress and author
 Norm Larker (Beaver Meadows), National League All-Star player for the LA Dodgers
 Matthew Lesko, infomercial personality
 Sherrie Levine, photographer and appropriation artist
 Jan Lewan, Polish-American songwriter and polka band leader, portrayed by actor Jack Black in the American comedy film The Polka King
 Edward B. Lewis, winner of the 1995 Nobel Prize in physiology and medicine
 Santo Loquasto, Tony Award winning Broadway production designer
 Marion Lorne, actress best known as Aunt Clara in the comedy series Bewitched
 John D. MacArthur, businessman and philanthropist
 Joe Maddon, current manager of Major League Baseball's Los Angeles Angels and former manager of the Tampa Bay Rays and Chicago Cubs
 Garrick Mallery, ethnologist
 Herman Mankiewicz, screenwriter of Citizen Kane
 Joseph L. Mankiewicz, Academy Award-winning director and producer
 Greg Manusky, Former NFL Player
 Al Markim, actor (Tom Corbett, Space Cadet)
 Tom Matchick, MLB player for the Detroit Tigers, Boston Red Sox, Kansas City Royals, Milwaukee Brewers, Baltimore Orioles
 Francis T. McAndrew, Psychologist/Professor/Author
 Jay McCarroll, Fashion Designer
 Mary McDonnell, actress twice nominated for Academy Award
 William G. McGowan, former MCI Communications chairman; responsible for breaking up the Bell Telephone monopoly
 Tom McHale (novelist born 1941)
 Edward Peter McManaman, Roman Catholic bishop
 Tommy McMillan, Major League Baseball outfielder and shortstop
 John Mellus, Former NFL player
 Edward Meneeley, painter
 Dan Meuser, U.S. Congressman
 Lou Michaels, Former NFL Player
 Walt Michaels, former head coach of the NFL's New York Jets
 Carl Ferris Miller, Banker and Arborist
 Joseph Montione, radio personality best known as "Banana Joe"
 Albert Mudrian, author and magazine editor
 Leo C. Mundy, Pennsylvania state senator and physician
 Jozef Murgas, radio pioneer
 Ray Musto, U.S. Representative from Pennsylvania
 Judith Nathan, wife of former New York City Mayor Rudolph Giuliani
 Claudette Nevins, actress
 Amedeo Obici, founder of Planters Peanuts
 Thomas J. O'Hara, Provincial of the U.S. Province of Priests and Brothers of the Congregation of the Holy Cross; former president of King's College, Pennsylvania
 Austin O'Malley (author)
 Jerry Orbach, Tony award-winning actor
 Phil Ostrowski, NFL player
 Jack Palance (Hazle Township), Oscar-winning actor
 Joe Palooka
 John Paluck, football player for Washington Redskins and Pro Bowl selection
 Jay Parini, professor and author
 Simon F. Pauxtis, Professional baseball player and college football coach
 Bob Patton, former NFL PLayer
 Mr. Peanut
 Maryanne Petrilla, served on the Luzerne County Board of Commissioners; second female Commissioner Chairperson in the county's history
 Anthony Petrosky, Poet
 Joe Pisarcik, Former NFL Quarterback
 William Daniel Phillips, co-recipient of the 1997 Nobel Prize in Physics
 Suzie Plakson, Actress
 Dave Popson, Former NBA basketball player
 John Quackenbush, Genome Scientist
 Krysten Ritter, actress
 Packy Rogers, infielder with the Brooklyn Dodgers
 Mendy Rudolph, NBA referee from 1953 to 1975
 Anne Sargent, Actress
 Sam Savitt, equestrian artist, author
 Michael Schoeffling, actor, played Jake Ryan in film Sixteen Candles
 M. Gerald Schwartzbach, California criminal defense attorney
 Paige Selenski, field hockey player for the US Olympic Team
 Fred Shupnik, Former member of the Pennsylvania House of Representatives
 Chuck Sieminski, Former NFL Player
 Greg Skrepenak, former NFL player, served on the Luzerne County Board of Commissioners, convicted felon
 Jonathan Slavin, character actor
 Ron Solt, former NFL player
 Andrew Soltis, Chess Grandmaster
Randy Stair, Eaton Township Weis Market Shooter
 Jacob Sullum, journalist and author, featured in Academy Award-nominated documentary Super Size Me
 Bob Sura, basketball player, Houston Rockets
 John Thomas Sweeney, murderer of Dominique Dunne, was born and raised in Hazleton
 Albert Tannenbaum, member of Murder, Inc., born in Nanticoke
 Louis Teicher, pianist; member of the duo Ferrante & Teicher
 Dan Terry, Trumpet player and big band leader
 Thomas Tigue, Pennsylvania state legislator
 Alexis Toth (St. Alexis of Wilkes-Barre), saint in the Eastern Orthodox Church
 Mike Tresh, MLB catcher
 Charley Trippi, University of Georgia football player, 1943 Rose Bowl MVP, College Football Hall of Fame inductee, Chicago Cardinals quarterback and Pro Football Hall of Fame inductee. The football stadium at Pittston Area High School in Yatesville is named in his honor.
 Bob Tucker, NFL tight end with the New York Giants
 Stephen Urban, served on the Luzerne County Board of Commissioners and the Luzerne County Council
G. Harold Wagner, Pennsylvania State Treasurer and Pennsylvania State Auditor General
 Frank Comerford Walker, Lawyer and Politician
 Ed Walsh, Hall of Fame pitcher; major league baseball's all-time ERA leader
 Michael Whalen, actor
 Faustin E. Wirkus, U.S. Marine allegedly crowned as King of La Gonâve, a Haitian island west of Hispaniola
 Ira W. Wood, represented  from 1904 to 1913
 Hendrick Bradley Wright, Lawyer and politician
 Frank Zane, bodybuilder, three-time Mr. Olympia, won Mr. America, Mr. Universe, Mr. World; donated gym at Wilkes University

References

Lists of people from Pennsylvania
People from Luzerne County, Pennsylvania